Shaikhpur is a small village in Pratapgarh district, Uttar Pradesh. The nearest river is the Loni River. It is situated near State Highway 36.

Shaikhpur is located 24 km from Pratapgarh and 150 km from Lucknow.

Villages in Pratapgarh district, Uttar Pradesh